Nothing to Fear may refer to:

 Nothing to Fear (Oingo Boingo album), 1982
 Nothing to Fear (MC Lars album), 1999
 "Nothing to Fear" (song), a 1992 song by Chris Rea
 "Nothing to Fear", a song by Depeche Mode from A Broken Frame
 Nothing to Fear (Once Upon a Time in Wonderland), an episode of the TV series Once Upon a Time in Wonderland
 Nothing to Fear (Batman: The Animated Series), an episode of the TV series Batman: The Animated Series
 "Nothing to Fear", an episode of the American children’s television series Bear in the Big Blue House

See also
 Nothing to fear but fear itself (disambiguation)